The women's singles competition at the 2017 FIL European Luge Championships was held on 5 January 2017.

Competition schedule
All times are (UTC+1).

Results
One run was used to determine the winner because the second run got delayed.

References

Women